The Tahrir al-Sham–Junud al-Sham conflict was a series of violent clashes between Hayat Tahrir al-Sham and several rival jihadist factions operating in the Idlib and Latakia governorates. The clashes began on 25 October 2021 after HTS demanded that the jihadist leader Muslim al-Shishani should stand trial after they accused him and his group of sheltering members of the Islamic State.

Clashes
On October 25, clashes began in and around Jisr al-Shugur and the Turkmen Mountains after forces of HTS attacked the headquarters of the Junud al-Sham faction, following a refusal to stand some of their members on trial as part of an internal security operation by HTS. The clashes soon also involved Jund Allah (a group of mostly Turkish and Azeri jihadists), Jund al-Islam, and unaffiliated foreign jihadists. Tensions increased when Jund Allah arrested several HTS fighters in the Turkmen Mountains. In response, HTS brought up to 100 vehicles with heavy weapons towards the north of Latakia. The same day, HTS stormed the headquarters of Jund Allah in Jisr al-Shugur.

On October 26, after hours of fighting, forces of HTS had taken Abu Aref hill in the Turkmen mountains from Jund Allah, killing 7 members of the faction. 4 members of HTS were also killed during the fighting. Under mediation of the Turkistan Islamic Party in Syria, HTS had secured a deal with two rival factions where they agreed to leave the Turkmen Mountains, however some members of the factions refused and continued fighting. Later, HTS forces captured 3 Chechen jihadists that had refused to abide by the deal. The deal also secured the transfer of prisoners.

On October 27, heavy clashes were reported between Jund Allah and HTS on the frontlines of the Turkmen Mountains, Latakia.

On October 28, HTS arrested two men after storming the village of Deir Hassan, for their part in a demonstration against the fighting in Latakia. The fighting ended after HTS managed to capture two Jund Allah field commanders together with Abu Musa al-Shishani, the brother of Muslim al-Shishani, the leader of Junud al-Sham. As a result, Muslim al-Shishani had to accept Tahrir al-Sham's terms to transfer his men to Idlib.

Aftermath 
Following the deal between HTS and Junud al-Sham & Jund Allah, it was reported on 29 October that HTS had executed several foreign members of jihadist groups on the frontlines in the Turkmen Mountains.

See also 
 Idlib Governorate clashes (June 2020)
 National Front for Liberation–Tahrir al-Sham conflict

References 

2021 in the Syrian civil war
Conflicts in 2021
Idlib Governorate in the Syrian civil war
Military operations of the Syrian civil war in 2021